The messengers who came from John the Baptist to Jesus are referred to in  and  in the New Testament.

Their deputation to meet with Jesus is recounted after the Baptism of Jesus, when John is in prison in the fort of Machaerus and hears of the works performed by Jesus. He seeks confirmation as to whether Jesus is the prophesied Messiah of the Old Testament. John sends (two of) his disciples as messengers to ask a question from Jesus: "Are you the one to come after me or shall we wait for another?"  Jesus replied back to John through the messengers to take note of all the miraculous works he has done as described in Luke 7:22.

According to the Gospel of Matthew:
 
When John heard in prison what Christ was doing, he sent his disciples to ask him, "Are you the one who was to come, or should we expect someone else?" Jesus replied, "Go back and report to John what you hear and see: The blind receive sight, the lame walk, those who have leprosy are cured, the deaf hear, the dead are raised, and the good news is preached to the poor. Blessed is the man who does not fall away on account of me." 

The "best manuscript authorities"  state that John sent word δια  των μαθητων αυτου, dia tōn mathētōn autou, i.e. by means of his disciples, although δύο τῶν μαθητῶν αὐτοῦ, duo tōn mathētōn autou, meaning two of his disciples, appears in the Textus Receptus. Biblical commentator Marvin Vincent argues that "the correct reading is διά". Luke's text also refers to "two of his disciples".

See also

 Chronology of Jesus
 Gospel harmony
 Mandaeans

Notes

Gospel episodes
John the Baptist